Associazione Sportiva Dilettantistica Narnese Calcio is an Italian association football club located in Narni, Umbria.

It currently plays in Serie D.

Return to Serie D
In the 2012–13 season the club won the Eccellenza Umbria and returned to Serie D after six years.

Colours and badge
The team's colours are red and blue. Its symbol is a griffin rampant, the same as the crest of the town of Narni.

References

External links
 Official Site 
 Official Supporters Page 

Football clubs in Italy
Association football clubs established in 1926
Football clubs in Umbria
1926 establishments in Italy